Why? is the final album by British drummer Ginger Baker. It was released in 2014 on Motema Music, and is his first solo album in 16 years.

Track listing
"Ginger Spice" (Ron Miles) – 6:08
"12+ More Blues" (Alfred Ellis) – 7:25
"Cyril Davis" (Ginger Baker) – 6:44
"Footprints" (Wayne Shorter) – 6:56
"Aïn Témouchent" (Ginger Baker) – 6:46
"St. Thomas" (Sonny Rollins) – 6:04
"Aiko Biaye" (Traditional) – 7:28
"Why?" (Ginger Baker) – 4:45

Personnel
Ginger Baker – drums
Pee Wee Ellis – saxophone
Alec Dankworth – bass
Abass Dodoo – percussion

References

Ginger Baker albums
2014 albums